Rohrberg is a municipality in the district Altmarkkreis Salzwedel, in Saxony-Anhalt, Germany. Since January 2009, it includes the former municipalities of Ahlum and Bierstedt.

References

Altmarkkreis Salzwedel